Catephia microcelis is a species of moth of the  family Erebidae. It is found in Nigeria.

References

Endemic fauna of Nigeria
Catephia
Moths described in 1926
Moths of Africa